Yang Lian (born 16 October 1982) is a Chinese weightlifter.

Yang participated in the women's 48 kg class at the 2006 World Weightlifting Championships and won the gold medal, snatching 98 kg and clean and jerking an additional 119 kg for a total of 217 kg. Both being world records and a world record for the total.

References

External links
 
 

Living people
1982 births
Chinese female weightlifters
Place of birth missing (living people)
World record holders in Olympic weightlifting
World Weightlifting Championships medalists
20th-century Chinese women
21st-century Chinese women